Fredrik Widgren (born 4 June 1994) is a swedish martial artist who represents his native country Sweden in sport jujitsu (JJIF).

Career 
When he was 6 years he visited for first time fighting club in Nacka near Stockholm where his older Sara was already training sport jujitsu. He began training sport jujitsu at age of 8. He has been trained by famous swedish jutsuka Ricard Carneborn. He is member of swedish ju-jitsu team since 2011. In 2019 he won world title (JJIF) in Abu Dhabi in discipline Fighting System, category −77 kg.

Results

Links

References

1994 births
Living people
Swedish martial artists
World Games bronze medalists
Competitors at the 2017 World Games
People from Nacka Municipality
Sportspeople from Stockholm County